Begünhan Elif Ünsal (born January 4, 1993) is a Turkish archer.

Private life
Begünhan Elif Ünsal was born in Isparta, Turkey on January 4, 1993. After finishing the private high school Altınbaşak College, she studied Sports Science at the Faculty of Health Science in Süleyman Demirel University in her hometown.

Sports career
Ünsal began her archery career at age ten, inspired by her archer older sister and encouraged by her father. She is trained by her father Yalçın Ünsal.

She participated at the 2010 Summer Youth Olympics in Singapore. She was eliminated in the second round in the individual event by the eventual silver medallist Tan Ya-Ting. She paired up with Abdul Dayyan bin Mohamed Jaffar of Singapore to win bronze in the mixed team event.

She won the silver medal in the youth category and the bronze medal in the senior category at the 2010 Archery European Indoor Championships held in Poreč, Croatia. At the 2010 European Archery Championships held in Rovereto, Italy, Ünsal became bronze medalist. She owns a gold medal won in the team event of the 2010 European Junior Cu, which took place in Reggio Calabria, Italy.

References

1993 births
People from Isparta
Süleyman Demirel University alumni
Archers at the 2010 Summer Youth Olympics
Turkish female archers
Archers at the 2015 European Games
European Games competitors for Turkey
Living people
21st-century Turkish sportswomen